Pennsylvania House of Representatives District 163 includes part of Delaware County. It is currently represented by Democrat Michael Zabel.

District profile
The district includes the following areas:

Delaware County:

 Aldan
 Clifton Heights
 Collingdale
 Darby Township (PART)
 Ward 03
 Ward 04
 Ward 05
 Upper Darby Township (PART)
 District 01
 District 02
 District 03 [PART, Divisions 01, 02, 03, 04, 05, 08, 09, 10 and 11]
 District 05 [PART, Divisions 04, 06, 08 and 09]

Representatives

Recent election results

References

External links
 from the United States Census Bureau
Pennsylvania House Legislative District Maps from the Pennsylvania Redistricting Commission.  
Population Data for District 44 from the Pennsylvania Redistricting Commission.

Government of Delaware County, Pennsylvania
163